Terkhiin Tsagaan Lake (is a fresh-water lake in the Khangai Mountains in central Mongolia, located in Tariat soum of Arkhangai province. In 670 km to the capital city Ulaanbaatar and 180 km to the center of Tariat soum.

The Khorgo volcano is located near the eastern end of the lake, 10 rivers join this lake and only the Suman River springs from it.  The lake is located in Khorgo-Terkhiin Tsagaan Nuur National Park.
According to the joint 2022 study of Mongolia's Ministry of Environment and Tourism and World Wide Fund for Nature, the area of the lake decreased by 6.4% from 7950.0 ha in 1995 to 7440.1 ha in 2015. This resulted in reduction of wetlands areas by 23.5% and increase by 39.4% of sands and eroded lands surrounding the lake.

See also
 Taryatu-Chulutu
 Тэрхийн цагаан нуур []
 Олон улсын ач холбогдол бyхий ус, намгархаг газар: Тэрхийн цагаан нуур, 2022 (Wetlands of international importance: Terkhin tsagaan lake, 2022) []

References

Lakes of Mongolia
Ramsar sites in Mongolia